Phebalium obcordatum, commonly known as the club-leaved phebalium, is a species of shrub that is endemic to New South Wales. It has smooth branchlets, small egg-shaped to heart-shaped leaves with the narrower end towards the base and small umbels of pale yellow flowers with silvery scales on the back of the petals.

Description
The upper surface of the leaves is warty and the lower surface densely covered with silvery scales. Flowering occurs from late winter to early spring.

Taxonomy and naming
Phebalium obcordatum was first formally described in 1863 by George Bentham in Flora Australiensis from specimens collected by Allan Cunningham.

Distribution and habitat
Club-leaved phebalium grows in woodland in hilly areas in central New South Wales south from Trundle and Cobar.

References

obcordatum
Flora of New South Wales
Plants described in 1863
Taxa named by George Bentham